Achemenides is a genus of millipedes in the family Conotylidae. There is at least one described species in Achemenides, A. pectinatus.

References

Further reading

 
 
 
 

Chordeumatida
Millipede genera